The February 25, 2000 Ozamiz Ferry Bombing is one of the Philippines' single bloodiest bombing incident. At least 44 people were killed, while more than 100 ferry passengers were wounded. Large incendiary bombs exploded on three buses of Super Five Tansport aboard the M/V Our Lady of Mediatrix ferry as it crossed Panguil Bay from Kolambugan, Lanao del Norte to Ozamiz City. Moro Islamic Liberation Front were among those blamed for the attack. The bomb exploded as the ferry was about 20 yards from the pier at Ozamiz. This action among others prompted President Joseph Estrada to declare "all-out war" against MILF.

References

 
Moro conflict
Ferry bombing
2000 murders in the Philippines
Terrorist incidents in the Philippines in 2000
Terrorist incidents in the Philippines